Hadi Choopan (also Romanized as "Hādi Chupān", (born 1987 in Beyza, Fars Province, Iran) is an Iranian professional bodybuilder and the Mr. Olympia 2022 winner. 
He is known as “The Persian Wolf”.

Biography
He was a fixed member of the Iranian National Bodybuilding Team from 2011 to 2016. Choopan has competed several times at International Federation of BodyBuilding and Fitness (IFBB) contests and won various titles.

Controversy

In 2018, President Donald Trump banned all Iranian nationals from entering the country, and Hadi was denied a visa to participate in the 2018 Arnold Classic. Hadi Choopan expressed his frustration and termed the incident discriminatory.

Before winning Mr. Olympia 2022, Choopan invoked the name of Ahura Mazda, the supreme deity of the pre-Islamic Iranian faith of Zoroastrianism, on Instagram.   He also dedicated the award to the "honorable women of Iran" showing solidarity with the Mahsa Amini protests. According to an official website of ifbb pro , Akbar Khazaei, professional judge of ifbbpro and (NPC) competitions, about Hadi Chopan's championship in Las Vegas 2022  has said, winning of the first place in the Mr.Olympia by an Iranian in America displays that racism, nationality and differences between governments does not affect the rights and status of athletes in Mr.Olympia and ifbb pro, and refereeing in these competitions is fair and just.

Titles and honors 
 15 provincial gold medals (Fars and Tehran provinces)
6 national medals (3 golds, 2 silvers, 1 bronze)
 WBPF World Championships: Silver medal, 2012
 WBPF Asia Championships: Gold medal, 2013
 WBPF World Championships: Gold medal, 2013, 2014, 2015
 Mr. Olympia Amateur: Gold medal, 2017
 IFBB Sheru Classic: Silver medal, 2017
 Asia Grand Prix: Silver medal, 2017
 San Marino Pro: Silver medal, 2017
 Dubai Expo: Silver medal, 2018
 IFBB Portugal Pro: Gold medal, 2018
 Asia Grand Prix: Gold medal, 2018
 IFBB Vancouver Pro: Gold medal, 2019
 Mr. Olympia 2019: 3rd place
 Mr. Olympia 2020: 4th place
 Mr. Olympia 2021: 3rd place
 Mr. Olympia 2022: 1st Place

References

External links 

 Official website
 
 Hadi Choopan's page on Instagram
 Hadi Choopan on Facebook
 Hadi Choopan's biography  (champexnews.com)
  Hadi Choopan on Evogen Nutrition
 Olympia Organization Working to Bring Hadi Choopan to United States (fitnessvolt.com – 1)
 Olympia Organization Working to Bring Hadi Choopan to United States (fitnessvolt.com – 2)
 مصاحبه با بزرگان پرورش اندام دنیا و هادی چوپان (aparat.com)
 گفتگوی اختصاصیِ تسنیم با هادی چوپان، قهرمان پرورش اندام جهان  (clip.ir)
 Hadi Choopan listed for Men’s Open Bodybuilding at the Vancouver Pro 2019 (generationiron.com)
 Watch Hadi Choopan Movies & TV-Series Online  (vipmovies.to)
 هادی چوپان در مِستر المپیا (dideo.com)
 گفتگو با هادی چوپان یک شب قبلِ مسابقات  (dideo.com)
 هادی چوپان سکوت را شکست/ مرا کنار گذاشتند چون به جوانان داروی تقلبی نفروختم! (rokna.net)

1987 births
Male bodybuilders
Iranian bodybuilders
Living people
People from Fars Province